Polylepis reticulata is a species of plant in the family Rosaceae. It is endemic to Ecuador.

References

reticulata
Endemic flora of Ecuador
Vulnerable plants
Taxonomy articles created by Polbot